NGC 13 is a spiral galaxy in the constellation Andromeda. It is estimated to be about 220 million light-years (66 Megaparsecs) away from the Sun. It was discovered on November 26, 1790, by William Herschel.

References

External links
 
 

Galaxies discovered in 1790
0013
17901126
Andromeda (constellation)
Spiral galaxies